Prolita sironae is a moth of the family Gelechiidae. It was described by Ronald W. Hodges in 1966. It is found in North America, where it has been recorded from California.

The wingspan is 14–17 mm. The forewings are streaked with white, buff white, pale yellow, brown, and black. The hindwings are fuscous with numerous orange scales.

References

Moths described in 1966
Prolita